A skomorokh ( in Russian,  in Old East Slavic,  in Church Slavonic. Compare with the Old Polish) was a medieval East Slavic harlequin, or actor, who could also sing, dance, play musical instruments and compose for oral/musical and dramatic performances.

Etymology 
The etymology of the word is not completely clear. There are hypotheses that the word is derived from the Greek  (cf. , 'joke'); from the Italian  ('joker', cf. English scaramouch); from the Arabic ; and many others.

History 
The skomorokhs appeared in Kievan Rus' no later than the mid-11th century, but fresco depictions of skomorokh musicians in the Saint Sophia Cathedral in Kyiv (Ukraine) date to the 11th century.

The Primary Chronicle on skomorokhs concurs with the period. The monk chronicler denounced them as devil servants. Furthermore, the Eastern Orthodox Church often railed against them and other elements of popular culture as being irreverent, detracting from the worship of God or being downright diabolical. For example, Theodosius of Kiev, one of the co-founders of the Caves Monastery in the 11th century, called the skomorokhs "evils to be shunned by good Christians". Their art was related and addressed to the common people and usually opposed the ruling groups. They were considered not just useless but even ideologically detrimental and dangerous by both the feudalists and the clergy.

They were persecuted in the years of the Mongol yoke, when the church strenuously propagated ascetic living. Their art reached its peak in the 15th to the 17th centuries. Their repertoire included mock songs, dramatic and satirical sketches, called  (glumy) in Russian ( in Ukrainian), performed in masks and skomorokh dresses to the sounds of domra, balalaika, gudok, bagpipes or buben (a kind of tambourine). The appearance of Russian puppet theatre was directly associated with skomorokh performances.

Skomorokhs performed in the streets and city squares, engaging with the spectators to draw them into their play. Usually, the main character of the skomorokh performance was a fun-loving saucy  (мужик in Ukrainian) of comic simplicity. The skomorokhs were often persecuted by the Russian Orthodox Church and civilian authorities.

In 1648 and 1657, Tsar Alexei Mikhailovich issued ukases banning skomorokh art as blasphemous, their inventory was destroyed, skomorokhs fell into captivity, were pursued but actors would still occasionally perform during popular celebrations.

The role of the skomorokhi in the preservation and dissemination of folklore was closely linked with their important contribution to the development of secular music, first in Kievan Rus’ and later in Muscovite Russia. Before the introduction of Christianity in the late tenth century, Kievan music was characterized primarily by ritualistic songs of worship, ceremonial (i.e., wedding, funeral) songs, and seasonal songs such as koliadky and haivky. With Byzantine Christianity came Byzantine chant and a vigorous attempt to suppress native music because of its close identification with paganism. This attempted suppression was only partially successful, because it was mainly aimed at the more populous urban centers and left the remote rural areas with their flourishing folk music relatively untouched.

In Popular Culture 
A skomorokh is introduced in the first episode of Andrei Tarkovsky's film Andrei Rublev (1966). Seeking shelter from heavy rain, the main characters enter a barn where they find a group of villagers being entertained by a skomorokh (played by Rolan Bykov). The skomorokh, who is a bitterly sarcastic enemy of the Church, earns a living with his scathing and obscene social commentary, and by making fun of the Boyars.

See also 
Bandurists
Busking
Goliards
Kobzar
Lirnyks
Minstrel
Troubadour

References

External links 
 
 Skomorokhi, the Troubadours of Old Rus

11th-century establishments in Russia
18th-century disestablishments in Russia
Russian culture
Ukrainian culture
Belarusian culture
Comedy
Theatre in Russia
Entertainment occupations
Obsolete occupations
Kobzarstvo
Jesters
Entertainment in Ukraine
Slavic paganism
Clowns
Slavic titles
Acting
Medieval occupations